Ceratophyllus affinis is a species of flea in the family Ceratophyllidae. It was described by Nordberg in 1935.

References 

Ceratophyllidae
Insects described in 1935